Corythoxestis yaeyamensis is a moth of the family Gracillariidae, known from Japan (the Ryukyu Islands).

The wingspan is 3.8-4.9 mm.

The hostplant for the species is Saurauia tristyla. They mine the leaves of their host plant. It is a purely upper epidermal miner of leaves in the larval stage, and is pupated within a pupal chamber made inside the mine. The
mine is linear, very long, irregularly curved, sometimes serpentine and
transparently whitish in appearance, without any trace of frass. The pupal chamber is placed
at the end of the mine either in the disc or at the margin of the leaf, ellipsoidal, with a
swollen lower side and a wrinkled upper side.

References

Phyllocnistinae
Moths of Japan
Moths described in 1998